Fort Chiswell Site is a historic archaeological site located at Fort Chiswell, Wythe County, Virginia. It is the site of a frontier fort built in 1758 as an outpost during the French and Indian War. The fort was situated at the junction of the Great Trading Path and the Richmond Road, near the New River. The fort fell into disrepair in the 18th century as both the county seat and courthouse were moved from Fort Chiswell to the county seat of Wytheville, 12 miles to the west. The remaining foundations of the Fort and its surrounding buildings were completely covered over during the construction of I-77 in Wythe County during the 1970s. There is a pyramid shaped historical marker of sandstone situated approximately 200 yards west-northwest of the fort's original location next to the old chicken house.

It was listed on the National Register of Historic Places in 1978.

References

Archaeological sites on the National Register of Historic Places in Virginia
Buildings and structures in Wythe County, Virginia
National Register of Historic Places in Wythe County, Virginia
Chiswell
Chiswell
Chiswell
1758 establishments in the Thirteen Colonies